Marie-Lynn Hammond (born August 31, 1948) is a Canadian folk singer-songwriter, broadcaster and playwright. Born in Montreal, Quebec, Canada to a Franco-Ontarian mother and an Anglo-Quebecer father, she is fluently bilingual and writes and performs material in both English and French.

She began her career as a founder of the folk music group Stringband, and later pursued a solo career. She was also a host of programming on CBC Radio in the 1980s and 1990s, including Dayshift and Musical Friends. She has also written several plays, including the bilingual musical Beautiful Deeds/De beaux gestes and the drama White Weddings.

On August 26, 2006, Hammond was thrown from her horse while horseback riding, and sustained serious injuries. Her friends organized two benefit concerts at Hugh's Room in January 2007 to help raise money for her non-insured health care costs. People who appeared at the concerts included Bob Bossin, Stuart McLean, Eve Goldberg, Garnet Rogers, Nancy White, Sylvia Tyson, Don Ross, Rick Salutin, Jian Ghomeshi and Mike Ford. The accident has left her with a visual impairment, but she has otherwise recovered and is working (and riding) again.

Discography
 Marie-Lynn Hammond (1978)
 Vignettes (1983)
 Impromptu (1985)
 Black & White...and shades of grey (1990)
 Pegasus (2003)
 Two Old White Horses (2009)
 Creatures (2013)
 Hoofbeats (2013)

Plays
 Beautiful Deeds/De beaux gestes (1985)
 White Weddings (1990)

References

External links
 Marie-Lynn Hammond

1948 births
Living people
Canadian folk singer-songwriters
Canadian women singer-songwriters
Canadian women dramatists and playwrights
Singers from Montreal
Anglophone Quebec people
Franco-Ontarian people
CBC Radio hosts
20th-century Canadian dramatists and playwrights
20th-century Canadian women writers
Canadian dramatists and playwrights in French
Writers from Montreal
20th-century Canadian women singers
21st-century Canadian women singers
Canadian women radio hosts
Feminist musicians